Russian Medical Fund was a humanitarian organization founded in Vienna, Virginia, to support medical care for children in Saint Petersburg, Russia, during the post-Soviet period.

Russian Medical Fund provided supplies, equipment, and physician training to the pediatric cardiac unit of Children's Hospital #1 of Saint Petersburg. The fund provided for a new 7-bed pediatric intensive care unit, purchased a heart-lung machine, and underwrote a complete renovation of the congenital surgery operating suite. In addition, RMF advocated the continuation of U.S. funding for civil society programs there and co-sponsored humanitarian and medical work being done by a related organization, Global Healing.

The organization was created as a private foundation in 1996 and continued operations until 2008. The fund was affiliated with the American International Health Alliance.

Notes

See also
 Healthcare in Russia

References 
 American International Health Alliance, website, "All AIHA Strategic Partners".
 Cardiac Surgery Department, Children's Hospital Number 1, St. Petersburg, Russia, website.
 Civil Society International, website, "International Organizations: Health and Medicine".
 Firedoglake, website, 24 November 2008, "Russian Medical Fund".
 Global Healing, Berkeley, California, website, "Contributors".
 Johnson's Russia List, website, 20 February 2006, #27 - JRL 2006-43 - JRL Home.
 King, Sheri, "To Russia, with Love," The Middletown Journal, Middletown, Ohio, 22 September 2001, local news, p. B5.
 PetersburgCity News, St. Petersburg, Russia, 20 June 2001, City news section, "A new heart surgery room opened in Children's City Hospital No. 1".
 Schanke, Jerry, "Giving the Gift of Life," Vienna Times, Vienna, Virginia, 16 August 2001, pp. A1, A7.

External links
 American International Health Alliance
 Cardiac Surgery, Children's Hospital website
 Civil Society International
 Firedoglake
 Global Healing
 Johnson's Russia List
 PetersburgCity News article

History of Saint Petersburg
Organizations based in Virginia
Health charities in the United States
Foreign charities operating in Russia